5-Phosphonooxy-L-lysine phospho-lyase (EC 4.2.3.134, 5-phosphohydroxy-L-lysine ammoniophospholyase, AGXT2L2 (gene)) is an enzyme with systematic name (5R)-5-phosphonooxy-L-lysine phosphate-lyase (deaminating; (S)-2-amino-6-oxohexanoate-forming). This enzyme catalyses the following chemical reaction

 (5R)-5-phosphonooxy-L-lysine + H2O  (S)-2-amino-6-oxohexanoate + NH3 + phosphate

This enzyme is a pyridoxal-phosphate protein.

References

External links 
 

EC 4.2.3